The 2022 African Taekwondo Championships was held in Kigali, Rwanda on 16 and 17 July 2022

Results

References 

African Taekwondo Championships